The Tista Express (Train numbers 707/708) is a scheduled train of the Bangladesh Railway, operating between Dhaka and Dewanganj Upazila Weekly off day is Monday. A high-speed inter-city train operated by Bangladesh Railways. It runs from Kamalapur railway station in Dhaka to Dewanganj railway station. The train is red-green Indonesian air brake. The load of the train is 18/36. This train connects the 4 districts of Dhaka, Gazipur, Mymensingh and Jamalpur on its journey. Dhaka to Dewanganj train schedule Tista Express takes 5 hours 10 minutes from Dhaka to Dewanganj.

Tista Express Train Schedule 

তিস্তা এক্সপ্রেস ট্রেনের স্টপেজ গুলি হচ্ছে | Tista Express Stoppage :

 বিমানবন্দর রেলওয়ে স্টেশনে 
 জয়দেবপুর জংশন স্টেশনে
 গফরগাঁও রেলওয়ে স্টেশনে 
 ময়মনসিংহ জংশন স্টেশনে 
 পিয়ারপুর রেলওয়ে স্টেশনে 
 জামালপুর জংশন স্টেশনে 
 মেলান্দহ বাজার
 ইসলামপুর বাজার
 এবং  দেওয়ানগঞ্জ বাজার

References
2. Dhaka to Dewanganj train schedule

External links

 Bangladesh Railway official site

Named passenger trains of Bangladesh